Ofer Eini (born 24 January 1959 in Beersheba) is an Israeli tax advisor and politician. From 2006 to 2014 he served as the Secretary General of the Histadrut. Immediately after he served as the chairman of the Israel Football Association (2014–2018). 

Eini challenged Arnon Bar-David for the leadership of the Histadrut in 2022. he was defeated by Bar-David, who won 78% of the vote to Eini's 22%.

References

1959 births
Israeli Labor Party politicians
Israeli trade unionists
Chairmen of the Israel Football Association
General Secretaries of Histadrut
Politicians from Beersheba
Living people